Altar Egos may refer to:

 "Altar Egos" (Arrested Development), a 2004 television episode
 "Altar Egos" (Roseanne), a 1994 television episode

See also
 Alter ego (disambiguation)